Refinement may refer to:

Mathematics 
 Equilibrium refinement, the identification of actualized equilibria in game theory
 Refinement of an equivalence relation, in mathematics
 Refinement (topology), the refinement of an open cover in mathematical topology
 Refinement (category theory)

Other uses 
 Refinement (computing), computer science approaches for designing correct computer programs and enabling their formal verification
 Refining, a process of purification
 Refining (metallurgy)
 Refinement (culture), a quality of cultural sophistication
Refinement (horse), a racehorse ridden by jockey Tony McCoy